The agile tit-tyrant (Uromyias agilis) is a species of bird in the family Tyrannidae, the tyrant flycatchers. It is native to Bolivia, Colombia, Ecuador, and Venezuela.

This bird lives in mountain forests in the Andes. It is associated with bamboo of the genus Chusquea. It builds its nest in the stalks, using the leaves to weave the cup and lining it with the feathers of other birds.

References

Further reading
 

agile tit-tyrant
Birds of the Colombian Andes
Birds of the Venezuelan Andes
Birds of the Ecuadorian Andes
agile tit-tyrant
agile tit-tyrant
Taxonomy articles created by Polbot